Illwill Creek is a stream in Clinton County, Kentucky, in the United States.

According to tradition, Illwill Creek was so named when pioneers at the site retreated reluctantly (with an "ill will") to hostile Indians.

See also
List of rivers of Kentucky

References

Rivers of Clinton County, Kentucky
Rivers of Kentucky